Harry Schmidt may refer to:

Harry Schmidt (USMC) (1886–1968), commanded the Fourth Marine Division in the Pacific during World War II
Harry Schmidt (mathematician) (1894–1951), German applied mathematician
Harry Schmidt (pentathlete) (1916–1977), South African Olympic modern pentathlete
Harry Schmidt (Air National Guard), American fighter pilot instructor